Kazanów  is a village in Zwoleń County, Masovian Voivodeship, in east-central Poland. It is the seat of the gmina (administrative district) called Gmina Kazanów.

The village has a population of 460.

External links
 Jewish Community in Kazanów on Virtual Shtetl

References

Villages in Zwoleń County